Laisamis is a small town in Kenya's Marsabit County. In Laisamis there is a Catholic church dedicated to St George. It is the 5th largest urban centre in Marsabit County with a population of 2,643.

The Isiolo-Moyale Highway passes through Laisamis.

References 

Populated places in Marsabit County